Indira Gandhi Centre for Atomic Research (IGCAR) is one of India's premier nuclear research centres. It is the second largest establishment of the Department of Atomic Energy (DAE), next to Bhabha Atomic Research Centre (BARC), located at Kalpakkam, 80 km south of Chennai, India. It was established in 1971 as an exclusive centre dedicated to the pursuit of fast reactor science and technology, due to the vision of Dr. Vikram Sarabhai. Originally, it was called as Reactor Research Centre (RRC). It was renamed as Indira Gandhi Centre for Atomic Research (IGCAR) by the then Prime Minister of India, Rajiv Gandhi in December 1985. The centre is engaged in broad-based multidisciplinary programme of scientific research and advanced engineering directed towards the development of Fast Breeder Reactor technology, in India.

History

The fast reactor related research in India, originated at BARC, Mumbai. Later, RRC was established at Kalpakkam with the same mandate. The Central Workshop, Safety Research Laboratory and Materials Sciences Laboratory were constructed in 1975–1976. Soon, the Radio-Chemistry Lab and Electronics and Instrumentation Lab were constructed.

The centre houses a Fast Breeder Test Reactor (FBTR), which attained its first criticality in October 1985.

A few years later, in 1994, SQUID, ASIC and Diamond Anvil Cells were developed. In the same year, High-Power Physics and Engineering Experiments were undertaken in the FBTR.

In 1996, KAMINI reactor reached criticality. State-of-the-art Neutronic Channels were commissioned for FBTR in 1999.

A Boron-Enrichment Plant was commissioned in April 2001.

A BARC Training School was started in 2006. In 2009,  FBTR was operated at a maximum power level of 18.6 MWt with 55 sub-assemblies for 1732 hours.

List of directors 
 Paranjpe: 
 Placid Rodriguez: 1 December 1992 – 31 October 2000 
 S. B. Boje: 1 November 2000 – 31 April 2004
 Baldev Raj: 1 May 2004 – 30 April 2011
 S. C. Chetal: 1 May 2011 – 31 January 2013
 P. R. Vasudeva Rao: 1 February 2013 – 31 August 2015
 S. A. V. Satya Murty: 1 September 2015 – 31 June 2016
 A. K. Bhaduri: 1 July 2016– 31st August 2021
B. Venkatraman: 1 September 2021 - present

Commercial reactors 

The facility houses two PHWRs that generate 220MWe each that operate for commercial purposes. These are managed independently by the Nuclear Power Corporation of India.

Research reactors 

There are three research reactors at IGCAR.

FBTR is a liquid metal cooled fast breeder test reactor, maintained by Reactor Operation and Maintenance Group (ROMG).
KAMINI 30 kWt reactor, starred in 1996, uses Uranium 233 fuel transformed from Thorium in the FBTR.
Prototype Fast Breeder Reactor, a 500MWe fast breeder reactor using Mixed Oxide (Uranium oxide + Plutonium oxide) fuel based on the Sodium-cooled fast reactor design.

In addition, the Research Facility also built the 100MWe reactor for India's first nuclear submarine the Arihant class submarine project and operated it on land for testing purposes since it attained criticality in December 2004. The submarine launched on 26 July 2009 has this reactor.

Reprocessing plant 
The Kalpakkam Atomic Reprocessing Plant [KARP] facility has been estimated to have a capacity to reprocess 100 tonnes of spent fuel plutonium per annum. It incorporates a number of innovative features such as hybrid maintenance concept in hot cells using servo-manipulators and engineered provisions for extending the life of the plant. This plant will caterijnikjnkjhgy7fffffh to the needs of reprocessing fuels from MAPS as well as FBTR. It has mastered the technology of reprocessing highly irradiated mixed carbide fuel for the first time in the world.

Fast reactor fuel reprocessing at IGCAR 

Reprocessing Development Laboratory was designed in early seventies and the commissioning of inactive facilities was carried
out in 1976. The plutonium handling facilities were cleared for operation in 1980. The reprocessing of irradiated thorium rods which was carried out during the period 1989 to 1992 in the concrete shielded cells, was the first major radioactive operation. The U-233 recovered during the operation was used in fabricating the fuel for the KAlpakkam MINI reactor (KAMINI). U-233 was also useful for the fuel development programme for carrying out the Prototype Fast Breeder Reactor test fuel irradiation experiments in Fast Breeder Test Reactor. Apart from this, the operation aided in validating the equipment and design of system as well as the manpower training. Later a hot cell facility for reprocessing of Fast Breeder Test Reactor fuel was conceived which had the necessary features for delivering the product with all the uncertainties in the dissolution of irradiated fuel and process flowsheet. Added to this was the need for the deployment of the yet to be proven designs of centrifuge and centrifugal extractors without which the success of the PUREX process for fast reactor fuel reprocessing would be doubtful. With these minimal inputs, the hot cell facility, Lead Mini Cell (LMC) was created, which was later rechristened as CORAL (COmpact Reprocessing facility for Advanced fuels in Lead cells). Based on the dissolution experiments carried out on unirradiated single pellets and systematic studies related to the third phase formation, the flow sheet, prepared earlier for the oxide fuel was modified.

Activities

Chemistry Group: Presently there are 4 subdivisions: Fuel Chemistry Division (FChD), Materials Chemistry Division (MCD), and Chemical Facilities Division (CFD). Facilities include Far-IR Fourier Transform Infrared Spectrometer, Fluorimeter RF-5000, Impedance Spectrometer and Inductively Coupled Mass Spectrometer (ICP-MS), Alpha Spectrometer, Liquid Scintillation Counter, High Purity Germanium Detector, Neutron Counter ED-XRF, HPLC, SFC, Ion Chromatography, Gas Chromatography, etc. Among various achievements of the Group, Radioisotope production for medicinal importance is the ongoing important projects and has societal impact.

Electronics, Instrumentation and Radiological Safety Group:

Electronics, Instrumentation and Radiological Safety Group consists of Instrumentation & Control Group and Radiological Safety & Environmental Group, Computer Division and Security Electronics Section.

Major activities of this group include: 
 Development of Full Scope, Replica type PFBR Operator Training Simulator, providing & management of Computing & Data Communication Facilities
 Design & Development of Electronic Instrumentation & Control systems for Nuclear Reactors.
 Design & Development of Innovative Instruments at low cost.
 Carryout Research and Services in Radiological Safety, Quality Assurance and Environmental Safety
Engineering Services Group: Includes Central Workshop, Electrical Services and Civil Engineering Section.

Fast Reactor Technology Group: Some activities include

 Operation  of Large Component Test Rig for sodium testing of critical PFBR components such as Transfer Arm, Inclined Fuel Transfer Machine, Failed Fuel Location Modules and Absorber Rod Drive  Mechanisms (ARDMs).
 Testing of  5.5MWt 19 tube model PFBR Steam Generator (SG)   in Steam generator test Facility  to optimise the design of Steam Generator for FBRs
 Sodium water reaction studies in SOWART  rig to assess  the  damage on SG materials on sodium water reaction, performance evaluation PFBR  of sodium leak detectors in LEENA facility,  Simulation of thermal transients and evaluation of  its effects  on critical  reactor components in  Thermal Shock Test Facility
 Experiments in SADHANA facility simulating passive decay heat removal of PFBR SGDHR system.
 Development and testing of fast reactor components in air, water and sodium
 Carrying out experiments in water for design qualification and validation of thermal hydraulics codes
 Hydraulic testing of Subassembly and Core components for FBR.
 Vibration and  noise analysis of fast reactor components
 Design, development and Analysis of various types    of  Electromagnetic  devices  used in  FBR’s
 Development of High Flux Rod heaters and high watt density   immersion heaters  for liquid sodium heating
 Testing of FFLM and core flow monitoring mechanisms
 Design and development of Integrated Cold Trap and Integrated Plugging Indicator for future FBR’s
 Development and fabrication of sodium sensors for level, flow and leak detection
 Development of Under Sodium Ultra Sonic scanner for under sodium viewing in FBR’s
 Process development of boron and separation technologies
 Setting up of Ambient Temperature Electro Refiner (ATER) facility
 Flow induced vibration testing of 7 Subassembly cluster
Metallurgy and Materials Group: This group works consists of the

Materials Science Group: This group consists of
 Material Physics Division
 Surface and Nano-Science Division
 Condensed Matter Physics Division
 SQUID MEG Project

Nuclear & Safety Engineering Group: The objectives of the N&SEG are
 To study the Radiological and Engineering Safety in Fast Breeder Reactor Systems and related Fuel Cycle Facilities
 Radiological Monitoring and Health Physics Programme in different Radioactive Facilities at IGCAR
 To carry out Industrial Safety Surveillance in all the facilities of the Centre
 To study the Environmental Aspects

Reactor Engineering Group

Reactor Operation & Maintenance Group: The Fast Breeder Test Reactor (FBTR), the flagship of this centre and Kalpakkam Mini Reactor (KAMINI) come under this group. Reactor Operation and Maintenance Group consists of Reactor Operation Division (ROD), Reactor Maintenance Division (RMD), Technical Services Division (TSD) and Training & Human Resources Development Division (THRDD).  Quality Assurance and Industrial Safety Section (QA&IS) and Liaison Cell are also coming under this group. Operation and maintenance of both FBTR & KAMINI reactors, planning and conducting irradiation programmes, reactor physics tests and engineering tests, manpower planning & training for FBTR and PFBR (BHAVINI), maintenance of chemical parameters of the coolants, periodic safety revaluation are carried out by ROMG.

Reprocessing Group: It is pursuing research and development of equipment and processes. It is also running a pilot plant for FBTR Fuel processing, constructing  demo plant for FBTR and PFBR fuel reprocessing and designing the PFBR reprocessing plant.

Fast Reactor Fuel Cycle Facility

Strategic & Human Resources Planning Section

Staff

The Centre has a staff strength of 2514 including 1243  Engineers and Scientists.

Budget

The annual outlay of the Centre is around 8450 Million INR towards its Research & Development activities and plan.

Collaborations

The interaction with IIT-M started in 1995 through two collaborative projects, which were initiated with late Dr. R.S. Alwar, eminent
professor in Applied Mechanics. The first project was on simulation of thermal shock on the control plug mockup and the second was
on simulation of thermal striping in the core structure. An MoU was established on 19 July 1997 for the formation of ‘IGCAR- IITM
Cell’ with Prof. R. Natarajan (then Director, IIT-M) as chairman and late Dr. Placid Rodriguez as Co-Chairman. Prof. K.V.S. Rama Rao
was Dean, ICSR during that period. In the first cell meeting held on 26 February 1997, seven projects were identified. Based on the
decisions taken in the meeting, four projects with a funding to the tune of eighty eight lakhs were sanctioned. In the past thirteen years,
twenty five meetings of the IGCAR-IITM cell have been conducted. Already twenty nine projects have been completed with the funds to the tune of 40.5 million and fifteen projects are in progress with a funding of 34 million.

Indira Gandhi Centre for Atomic Research, Kalpakkam, has entered into a collaboration with the IIT Kharagpur to carry out research related to the design and development of Fast Breeder Reactors (FBRs). A dedicated IGCAR-IITKGP R&D cell has been set up in the premises of IIT Kharagpur under the Advanced Technology Development Centre's Structural Reliability Research Facility of IIT KGP.

Training school
IGCAR has a BARC Training School where young science post graduates and engineering graduates are trained in multiple disciplines for a period of one year.

References

External links 
IGCAR

Atomic Energy Commission of India
1971 establishments in Tamil Nadu
Government agencies established in 1971
Research institutes established in 1971
Research institutes in Tamil Nadu
Nuclear research institutes
Atomic and nuclear energy research in India
Homi Bhabha National Institute
Nuclear reprocessing sites
Monuments and memorials to Indira Gandhi